Bhagya Devatha is a 1959 Indian Tamil language film directed by Tapi Chanakya. The film stars Gemini Ganesan and Savitri. It was made in Telugu with the title Bhagya Devatha, also directed by Chanakya.

Plot

Cast 
List adapted from Thiraikalanjiyam

Male cast
Gemini Ganesan
M. N. Nambiar
K. Natarajan
Female cast
Savitri
Rajasulochana
M. S. S. Bhagyam

Production 
The film was produced under the banner Sri Sarathi Studios and was directed by Tapi Chanakya.

Soundtrack 
Music was composed by Master Venu while the lyrics were penned by Thanjai N. Ramaiah Dass.

References

Bibliography

External links 
 

1950s Tamil-language films
Films directed by Tapi Chanakya
Indian black-and-white films
Indian drama films
Films scored by Master Venu